Ain Soph Aur is a compilation album by the Japanese rock band Rentrer en Soi. It was released on November 19, 2008, shortly before they disbanded.

Track listing

Disc 1

Disc 2

2008 compilation albums
Rentrer en Soi albums